1982 A Love Marriage is an Indian comedy film directed by Prashant Gore and produced by Shivkumar Sharma. The film has been released by multiple international film festivals. Now the film is being shown worldwide by National and International TV channels. The film is available on Amazon Prime Video, MX Player etc.

Overview
1982 A Love Marriage is directed by Prashant Gore. It stars Amitkumar Sharma and Omna Harjani in the lead cast. The film is picturized as 1980s film. First trailer was unveiled on 29 January. The film was first scheduled for release on 26 February 2016 but the release date was later pushed because of not getting enough screens for release. The producer Shivkumar Sharma said that they don't have enough budget to compete with the films like Aligarh and Tere Bin Laden: Dead or Alive which were released on 26 February 2016.

Cast
Amitkumar Sharma as Prem
Omna Harjani as Suman
Gaurav Prakash Kothari
Rita Agarwal
Aloksen Gupta
Indira Mansukhani
Sahil Patel
Nirmal Sehrawat

Film Festivals
1982 a love marriage won "Best Romantic Film" award at the 9th Jaipur International Film Festival in India
1982 a love marriage was Nominated at the 9th Jaipur International Film Festival in India
1982 a love marriage was Nominated at the 5th Delhi International Film Festival in India
1982 a love marriage Official Selection at the Bioscope Global Film Festival in India

Awards and nominations

References

http://indianexpress.com/article/entertainment/bollywood/1982-a-love-marriage-release-put-on-hold/

External links

2016 films
2010s Hindi-language films
Indian comedy films
2016 comedy films
Hindi-language comedy films